Haozhuang Township is a township of Wuji County in southwestern Hebei province, China, located  southwest of the county seat. , it has 19 villages under its administration.

See also
List of township-level divisions of Hebei

References

Township-level divisions of Hebei